Geoffrey M. McGivern is a British actor in film, radio, stage and television, as well as a comedian. He is best known for originating the role of Ford Prefect in The Hitchhiker's Guide to the Galaxy.

Career
He played Ford Prefect in the radio series (1978–80) and subsequent LP releases of The Hitchhiker's Guide to the Galaxy by Douglas Adams whom he knew from Cambridge University, and reprised the role for the four new series broadcast on BBC Radio 4 between 2004 and 2018. A more recent radio broadcast was in The Ape That Got Lucky and has appeared in TV shows such as Noel's House Party, Press Gang, Chef!, Big Train, Blackadder the Third ("Dish and Dishonesty"), Chelmsford 123, Jonathan Creek, 15 Storeys High, Armstrong and Miller, Toast of London and series three of Peep Show.

McGivern appeared in the first series of cult comedy show Big Train in 1998, and later that year for the 1998 radio SciFi drama Paradise Lost in Cyberspace (Colin Swash, BBC) McGivern teamed up with old Hitchhiker's colleague Stephen Moore and Lorelei King (member of cast in the 2005 Hitchhiker's radio show sequel). He later played the Supreme Ruler in BBC2's sci-fi comedy Hyperdrive (2006–2007). In 2007 he appeared in the BBC Radio 4 comedy Peacefully in their Sleeps and in 2008 he appeared as Professor John Mycroft in the BBC2 science sitcom Lab Rats and in the 2008 BBC series Little Dorrit where he played Mr Rugg. He also appeared in episode 5 of series 3 of the TV series A Bit of Fry and Laurie. In 2015, he guest-starred in EastEnders as Dickie Ticker, the crude comic brought in by Mick Carter for Kush Kazemi's stag night. In 2016, he appeared in four episodes of the Disney Channel musical drama The Lodge, as Patrick. McGivern played the narrator Charlie Swinburne in the BBC Radio's 2013 six part dramatisation of G.K. Chesterton's The Club of Queer Trades.

In 2017, he appeared in the Channel 4 sitcom Back, written by Simon Blackwell, alongside David Mitchell and Robert Webb. Later that year, he began portraying the recurring role of Frank in the Netflix series Free Rein.

Since 2019 he has appeared as occasional character Barclay Beg-Chetwynde in the BBC comedy Ghosts.
In 2022 he appeared as the main character Russ, in Radio 4 comedy No-Platformed. The show's episode guide contains a humorous note about McGivern's extensive credit list, by starting a list of his credits and then adding "oh, hundreds of things".

References

External links
 
 

Male actors from London
Alumni of Christ's College, Cambridge
English male television actors
English male radio actors
English male film actors
Living people
People from Balham
People educated at Archbishop Holgate's School
Year of birth missing (living people)